Vostochny is a rural locality (a settlement) and the administrative center of Vostochny Selsoviet of Oktyabrsky District, Amur Oblast, Russia. The population was 1,289 as of 2018. There are 16 streets.

Geography 
Vostochny is located 3 km south of Yekaterinoslavka (the district's administrative centre) by road. Yekaterinoslavka is the nearest rural locality.

References 

Rural localities in Oktyabrsky District, Amur Oblast